Lac de Retournemer is a lake in Xonrupt, Vosges, France. At an elevation of 776 m, its surface area is 0.05 km².

Lakes of Vosges (department)
Glacial lakes of France
LRetournemer